Porcos Cegos (also known as Blind Pigs) is a punk rock band formed in 1993 in the city of Barueri, Brazil, mainly influenced by Forgotten Rebels, Misfits and Ramones. The group entered a hiatus in 2005 and regrouped in 2006 with new band members and the record Heróis ou Rebeldes. Starting in 2000, the band has released records by its own label Sweet Fury Records.

International collaborations
The band's first album, São Paulo Chaos, was produced by Jay Ziskrout, former drummer of Bad Religion.  Blind Pigs has opened shows for established punk rock bands such as Dead Kennedys and NOFX.

Awards
Best Album:  Blind Pigs (self-titled).  Punk International, 2002 
Best Punk Band.  Punknet Awards, 2004

Members
Henrike: vocals
Galindo: bass
Mauro: guitar
Arnaldo: drums

Past
Pablo: guitar
Kléber: drums
Gordo: guitar
Fabiano: guitar
Buda: drums
Fralda: bass

Discography
São Paulo Chaos (1997) — Paradoxx Music
The Punks Are Alright (2000) — Sweet Fury Records
Blind Pigs (2002) — Sweet Fury Records
Suor, Cerveja e Sangue (live) (2003) — Sweet Fury Records
Porcos Cegos (EP) (2004) — Sweet Fury Records
Heróis ou Rebeldes (2006) — Sweet Fury Records
Capitânia (2013) — Pirates Press Records
Lights Out (2021) — Hearts Bleed Blue

Brazilian punk rock groups
Musical groups established in 1993
1993 establishments in Brazil